Viktor Sergeyevich Samokhin (24 January 1956 – 13 May 2022) was a Soviet and Russian football player and coach.

International career
Samokhin played his only game for USSR on November 21, 1979 in a friendly against West Germany.

Honours
Spartak Moscow
 Soviet Top League: 1979

References

External links
  Profile

1956 births
2022 deaths
Footballers from Moscow
Russian footballers
Soviet footballers
Association football defenders
Soviet Union international footballers
Soviet Top League players
FC Spartak Moscow players
PFC CSKA Moscow players
FC Sokol Saratov players
FC FShM Torpedo Moscow players
Russian football managers